Stereocaulon glareosum is a species of snow lichen belonging to the family Stereocaulaceae.

Ecology
Stereocaulon glareosum is a known host to the lichenicolous fungus species:

 Arthonia stereocaulina
 Cercidospora stereocaulorum
 Endococcus nanellus
 Lasiosphaeriopsis stereocaulicola
 Lichenosticta dombrocskae
 Merismatium decolorans
 Polycoccum trypethelioides
 Rhymbocarpus stereocaulorum
 Taeniolella christiansenii

References

Stereocaulaceae
Lichen species
Lichens described in 1914
Taxa named by Vsevolod Savich